Fitzpatrick is an unincorporated community and census-designated place in Bullock County, Alabama, United States. As of the 2010 census, its population was 83. The community is served by Alabama State Route 110.

Demographics

References

Unincorporated communities in Bullock County, Alabama
Unincorporated communities in Alabama
Census-designated places in Bullock County, Alabama
Census-designated places in Alabama
Ghost towns in North America